The 2017 Colonial Athletic Association men's basketball tournament was held March 3–6, 2017 at North Charleston Coliseum in North Charleston, South Carolina. The champion, UNC Wilmington, received an automatic bid to the 2017 NCAA tournament with a 78–69 win over Charleston.

Seeds
All 10 CAA teams participated in the tournament. Teams were seeded by conference record, with a tiebreaker system used to seed teams with identical conference records. The top six teams received a bye to the quarterfinals.

Schedule

Bracket

Game summaries

First round

Quarterfinals

Semifinals

Championship

Team and tournament leaders

Team leaders

See also
 Colonial Athletic Association
 2017 CAA women's basketball tournament

References

Colonial Athletic Association men's basketball tournament
Tournament
North Charleston, South Carolina
College basketball tournaments in South Carolina
CAA men's basketball tournament
CAA men's basketball tournament